Tha Na Laithean a' Dol Seachad (The Days Flash Past) is the fifth album by Scottish musician Paul Mounsey released in 2005 (see 2005 in music).

Track listing 
 "Iomair Thusa Choinnich Cridh"
 "Tha Na Laithean a' Dol Seachad (The Days Flash Past)"
 "Gleann An Fhraoich"
 "M'eudail Air Do Shuilean Donna / A'nochd 's a-Raoir"
 "Thig Am Bata"
 "Fill-lu o ru hu o / Mor a Cheannaich"
 "Beacon No 1"
 "Tim(e)"
 "Beacon No 2"
 "A' Feitheamh Fad'"
 "Beacon No 3"
 "Lewis Rain"

References

2005 albums
Paul Mounsey albums